Gloria De Piero (born 21 December 1972) is a British television and radio presenter, and former Labour Party politician. 

Prior to her political career, she was the political editor of GMTV. A member of the Labour Party, she was first elected as Member of Parliament (MP) for Ashfield in 2010. She held positions in the Opposition frontbench under the leadership of both Ed Miliband and Jeremy Corbyn. This included being the Shadow Minister for Women and Equalities between October 2013 and September 2015, and the Shadow Justice Minister between July 2017 and July 2019. She announced her decision to step down from politics at the same time as she quit the Labour frontbench in July 2019.

In 2020, she co-presented Talkradio's Sunday morning political programme alongside Alexis Conran. From July 2020 until May 2021 she presented her own programme on Times Radio on Friday mornings, and co-presented the Sunday morning political programme G&T alongside Tom Newton Dunn. In 2021 she moved to GB News where she works as a presenter.

Early life
De Piero was born on 21 December 1972 in Bradford, West Riding of Yorkshire, England to Giorgio and Maddalena De Piero. Her parents are Italian immigrants who moved to the United Kingdom to work in Bradford's textile mills. Her father had a mental health crisis when she was around the age of nine. This resulted in him requiring admissions to psychiatric hospitals throughout her childhood. His mental health meant that he could not continue to work, and De Piero's mother gave up her job to look after him, and the family lived on benefits.

She attended Yorkshire Martyrs Catholic College where she obtained five GCSEs, and Bradford College where she gained two D A Levels. During her youth, De Piero was a member of Socialist Organiser, and joined the Labour Party's student wing Labour Students at the age of 18. De Piero then studied sociology at the University of Central England (now Birmingham City University) and the University of Westminster, graduating with a first. She was involved in the Labour Students' campaign in 1996–1997 as one of its national officers based in London. After the 1997 general election which resulted in the Labour Party winning in a landslide, De Piero applied for several government positions including as a special adviser, parliamentary researcher, and at left-wing think tanks but failed to gain employment.

Media career
De Piero worked as a researcher for ITV's Jonathan Dimbleby show. She then moved to the BBC where she worked at On the Record. While working at the BBC, she completed a master's degree at Birkbeck, University of London. From 2003 to 2010, she was the political editor for GMTV.

On 2 June 2020, De Piero was announced as a presenter on the new Times Radio station. She presented her own show on Friday mornings, and co-presented the Sunday morning political show G&T alongside the former political editor of The Sun, Tom Newton Dunn. In April 2021 she announced that she was joining the weekday afternoon programme of GB News, a new TV channel. In August it was announced that De Piero would host a new political programme on the channel: The Briefing: Lunchtime with Gloria De Piero. She launched interview show Gloria Meets on the network in November 2022.

Parliamentary career

2010 to 2015 
In February 2010, De Piero resigned as GMTV's political editor to seek selection as the Labour candidate for the Ashfield constituency in the 2010 general election. The candidacy became vacant following the announcement that the constituency's Labour MP, former Defence Secretary Geoff Hoon, would be stepping down at the election. On 21 March, she was selected as the party's candidate. De Piero was elected with a majority of 192 votes (reduced from 10,213 in 2005) after a 17.2% swing to the Liberal Democrats. During her election campaign, it was reported that she had posed for topless photographs for a modelling agency at the age of 15. Three years later, an unnamed news agency attempted to buy the photographs on behalf of a national newspaper. It later emerged that The Mail on Sunday had purchased the photographs in 2010. De Piero issued a legal warning to the newspaper that she had been underage when the photographs were taken and the negatives were returned to her with an apology.

In October 2010, Labour leader Ed Miliband appointed De Piero as a shadow culture minister. In the 2011 reshuffle, De Piero became Shadow Minister for Crime Prevention, and in 2013, she was promoted to the shadow cabinet as Shadow Minister for Women and Equalities.

In 2012, De Piero held a national roadshow called Why Do People Hate Me? to discover why voters were so disenchanted with politicians. She interviewed six groups of people including retired miners and warehouse workers.

2015 to 2019 

At the 2015 general election, De Piero held Ashfield with an increased majority of 8,820. In September 2015, De Piero was elected to the Labour Party's Conference Arrangements Committee with 109,888 votes. In new Labour leader Jeremy Corbyn's first shadow cabinet, De Piero was made Shadow Minister for Young People and Voter Registration, a new shadow cabinet-level role. She resigned her shadow cabinet position on 26 June 2016, among dozens of her colleagues, believing Corbyn could not lead the party to a general election victory.

De Piero supported the UK remaining within the European Union (EU) in the 2016 UK EU membership referendum, and was present with Corbyn at the launch of the Labour In for Britain campaign. Approximately 70% of her constituents voted for the UK to leave the EU. She supported Owen Smith in the failed attempt to replace Corbyn in the 2016 Labour leadership election.

At the June 2017 general election, De Piero's majority in Ashfield fell to just 441 votes. The following month, she accepted a place in Corbyn's shadow front-bench team as Shadow Justice Minister.

In the indicative votes on 27 March 2019, De Piero voted for the Norway-plus model, and to a customs union with the EU. In July 2019, she resigned from the shadow front-bench and announced that she would not stand at the next general election. On 12 December 2019, she was succeeded as Member of Parliament for Ashfield, Nottinghamshire by the Conservative politician Lee Anderson, her former office manager.

After prime minister Boris Johnson's Brexit deal was approved by Parliament, De Piero tweeted: "I'll forever regret not doing this. I knew @CarolineFlintMP + others were right at the time but as I said to her many times I'm not as brave as you Caroline when it comes to voting against a Whip. I should have been braver because I knew the Whip was fundamentally wrong".

Personal life
De Piero married James Robinson in 2012. Robinson was a media correspondent at The Guardian, media editor at The Observer and an employee at PR firm Powerscourt. He was the director of communications for former deputy leader of the Labour Party Tom Watson.

References

External links
 
 
 TV Newsroom
 Bradford College alumni
 On the Record archive
 A letter to Times Higher Education in 1995 when UCE student union president

|-

|-

1972 births
Living people
Alumni of Birkbeck, University of London
Alumni of Birmingham City University
Alumni of the University of Westminster
BBC Radio 5 Live presenters
English people of Italian descent
British political journalists
Female members of the Parliament of the United Kingdom for English constituencies
GMTV presenters and reporters
British politicians of Italian descent
Labour Party (UK) MPs for English constituencies
Alliance for Workers' Liberty people
People from Wibsey
UK MPs 2010–2015
UK MPs 2015–2017
UK MPs 2017–2019
21st-century British women politicians
British radio presenters
British women radio presenters
GB News newsreaders and journalists
British broadcaster-politicians